André Pieters (10 September 1922 – 22 February 2001) was a Belgian professional racing cyclist. He won the Omloop Het Nieuwsblad in 1946.

References

External links
 
 

1922 births
2001 deaths
Belgian male cyclists
Sportspeople from West Flanders
People from Lendelede
20th-century Belgian people